Bob Leduc (born May 23, 1944 in Sudbury, Ontario) is a former professional ice hockey player who played 158 games in the World Hockey Association. He played with the Ottawa Nationals and Toronto Toros.

Leduc played junior hockey with the Sudbury Wolves. He played seven seasons in the American Hockey League with the Providence Reds before getting called up to the World Hockey Association. He briefly served as player-coach while with the Toros. From 1975-77, he spent two additional seasons in the minors with the Maine Nordiques. Leduc later returned to Rhode Island and worked in the Reds' front office while also investing in are real estate.

WHA coaching record

References

External links

1944 births
Canadian ice hockey left wingers
Ice hockey people from Ontario
Living people
North American Hockey League (1973–1977) coaches
Ottawa Nationals players
Sportspeople from Greater Sudbury
Toronto Toros
Toronto Toros players